Gujo is a town located in Sindh, Pakistan. The most important archaeological sites of Amri Culture have been discovered near Gujo.

Populated places in Sindh